The Senate Armed Services Subcommittee on Seapower is one of seven subcommittees within the Senate Armed Services Committee.

Jurisdiction
The Seapower Subcommittee has jurisdiction over all U.S. Navy, U.S. Marine Corps, including non-tactical air programs, and the Naval Reserve forces.

Members, 118th Congress

Historical subcommittee rosters

117th Congress

116th Congress

115th Congress

Notes

References

See also 
 U.S. House Armed Services Subcommittee on Seapower and Projection Forces

External links
Senate Armed Services Committee home page
Senate Armed Services Committee subcommittee list and membership page

Armed Services Seapower